Artem (or Artyom) Vladimirovich Zhoga (born 18 January 1975) is the current commander of the Sparta Battalion, a pro-Russian separatist force that is involved in the Russo-Ukrainian War. His son Vladimir was the commander of the battalion from 2016 until his death in 2022.

On 9 May 2022 for Victory Day, Zhoga met with Vladimir Putin in Moscow where his late son's Hero of the Russian Federation award was presented to him. On 30 September, he was seen present in the front-row seating during Vladimir Putin's signing ceremony in Moscow Kremlin's St. George's Hall for the Russian Annexation of Southern and Eastern Ukraine.

References 

1975 births
Living people
People of the Donetsk People's Republic
Ukrainian collaborators with Russia
Pro-Russian people of the war in Donbas
People from Donetsk Oblast